Thiago dos Santos Ferreira (born 14 May 1984), or simply Thiago Santos, is a Brazilian footballer who last played for Cianorte.

References

External links

1984 births
Living people
Brazilian footballers
Brazilian expatriate footballers
J. Malucelli Futebol players
Rio Claro Futebol Clube players
A.F.C. Tubize players
Coritiba Foot Ball Club players
Guarani FC players
AEP Paphos FC players
Paraná Clube players
Clube Atlético Bragantino players
Cuiabá Esporte Clube players
Belgian Pro League players
Cypriot First Division players
Expatriate footballers in Belgium
Expatriate footballers in Cyprus
Association football midfielders
Footballers from Rio de Janeiro (city)